Mary Ann Holzkamp was the Democratic mayor of Glen Cove, New York  from 2002 to 2005. She was defeated by third party candidate Ralph V. Suozzi in the 2005 mayoral election. She was the city's first female mayor.

References

Year of birth missing (living people)
Living people
New York (state) Democrats
Mayors of places in New York (state)
Women in New York (state) politics
Politicians from Glen Cove, New York